Andrzej “Andy” Piotr Mazurczak (born 27 December 1993) is a Polish professional basketball player for Wilki Morskie Szczecin of the Polish Basketball League (PLK).

Professional career
He played for Kavala of the Greek A2 Ethniki on 2016–17 and for the NINERS Chemnitz of the German ProA league in the 2017–18 season.

On July 11, 2018, he signed with Cáceres Patrimonio de la Humanidad of the LEB Oro.

On 12 August 2019, Mazurczak signed with Aris Leeuwarden of the Dutch Basketball League (DBL). He led Aris in both scoring and assists, with 16.5 points and 5.5 assists per game before the season was cancelled due to the COVID-19 pandemic.

On July 29, 2021, he has signed with Stelmet Zielona Góra of the PLK.

On June 10, 2022, he has signed with Wilki Morskie Szczecin of the Polish Basketball League (PLK).

National team career
In summer 2017, he was a member of Poland’s national basketball team.

References

External links
REAL GM profile
Andy Mazurczak Junior Year Highlights (2014-2015) - Youtube.com video
Wisconsin–Parkside Rangers bio

1993 births
Living people
Aris Leeuwarden players
Basket Zielona Góra players
Dutch Basketball League players
Kavala B.C. players
NINERS Chemnitz players
Point guards
Polish expatriate basketball people in Germany
Polish expatriate basketball people in Greece
Polish expatriate basketball people in Spain
Polish men's basketball players
Wisconsin–Parkside Rangers men's basketball players